The Independence Hall Association (IHA) was founded in 1942 to be the driving force behind the creation of Independence National Historical Park, in Philadelphia, Pennsylvania. In 1995, it created the website that today is called UShistory.org, with over 3 million page views monthly. The IHA is a nonprofit, independent facilitating organization. Its mission today is to educate the public about the Revolutionary and Colonial eras of American history, as well as Philadelphia generally.

The association was organized by Edwin O. Lewis, formerly a judge in the common pleas court and at the time president of the Pennsylvania Chapter of the Sons of the American Revolution, to advocate and coordinate preservation of Independence Hall, the Liberty Bell, Carpenters' Hall, Christ Church and related colonial era buildings in downtown Philadelphia. Lewis was especially motivated by concerns (following the attack on Pearl Harbor) that the historic district was at risk in the event of an air raid or other such attack.

References

External links
UShistory.org
Independence Hall Association: Who We Are

1942 establishments in Pennsylvania
Non-profit organizations based in Pennsylvania
Organizations based in Philadelphia
Organizations established in 1942